, is a stony Hungaria asteroid from the inner regions of the asteroid belt, approximately 5 kilometers in diameter. It was discovered on 14 March 1988, by American astronomer Jeffrey Alu at the U.S. Palomar Observatory, California.

Orbit and classification 

The presumed E-type asteroid may not be a member of the Hungaria family, which form the innermost dense concentration of asteroids in the Solar System, but an unrelated interloper, which intruded into the Hungaria orbital space, as indicated by a lower albedos from observations by the NEOWISE mission. It orbits the Sun at a distance of 1.7–1.9 AU once every 2 years and 6 months (900 days). Its orbit has an eccentricity of 0.05 and an inclination of 19° with respect to the ecliptic. The body's first yet unused observation was made at the Chinese Purple Mountain Observatory in 1983.

Rotation period 

Between February 2005 and January 2015, American astronomer Brian D. Warner obtained 5 rotational lightcurves for this asteroid from photometric observations at the CS3–Palmer Divide Station in Colorado. The lightcurves gave a well-defined rotation period of 2.892–2.898 hours with a low brightness variation between 0.06 and 0.15 magnitude.

Diameter and albedo 

According to two different data sets from space-based survey carried out by the NEOWISE mission of NASA's Wide-field Infrared Survey Explorer, the asteroid measures 4.9 and 5.3 kilometers in diameter and its surface has an albedo of 0.19 and 0.25, respectively, while the Collaborative Asteroid Lightcurve Link  assumes an albedo of 0.30 – a compromise value between 0.4 and 0.2, corresponding to the Hungaria asteroids as collisional family and orbital group, respectively – and calculates a smaller diameter of 4.2 kilometers, based on an absolute magnitude of 13.8.

Naming 

As of 2017,  remains unnamed.

References

External links 
 Lightcurve plot of (6382) 1988 EL, Palmer Divide Observatory, B. D. Warner (2011)
 Asteroid Lightcurve Database (LCDB), query form (info )
 Dictionary of Minor Planet Names, Google books
 Asteroids and comets rotation curves, CdR – Observatoire de Genève, Raoul Behrend
 Discovery Circumstances: Numbered Minor Planets (5001)-(10000) – Minor Planet Center
 
 

006382
Discoveries by Jeff T. Alu
19880314